Sakarçäge is a city and capital of Sakarçäge District, Mary Region, Turkmenistan.

Etymology
Atanyyazow states that the name is related to the Sakar people, a minor Turkmen tribe. The word çäge means sand. The settlement was previously called Çetili (Chetili).

References

Populated places in Mary Region